Farmacia de guardia ("Pharmacy on Duty") is a Spanish comedy serial, originally broadcast on Antena 3 from 1991 to 1995.

Cast 

 Concha Cuetos - Lourdes Cano
 Carlos Larrañaga - Adolfo Segura
 José Soriano - Don Enrique Cano
 Maruchi León - Pili Fernández
 África Gozalbes - Reyes «Queen» González
 Miguel Ángel Garzón - Enrique Segura
 Julián González - Guillermo Segura

Awards

References

External links 
 

1991 Spanish television series debuts
1995 Spanish television series endings
Antena 3 (Spanish TV channel) network series
1990s Spanish comedy television series